Nyland Station is a railway station on the Trunk Line located in the Grorud borough of Oslo, Norway. Situated  from Oslo Central Station, it consists of two wooden side platforms along a double-tracked line. Nyland is served by the L1 line of the Oslo Commuter Rail. The station was opened on 17 June 1961, although an unofficial stop had been in place since 1942. It serves a mostly industrial area, including Mantena's rolling stock maintenance base.

History
The Trunk Line past Nyland opened on 1854. The area gradually grew up as an industrial site, with a major match factory established in 1865. The Norwegian State Railways later establish a major depot at Nyland in 1943. To allow workers access, trains on the Trunk Line started calling at Nyland no later than 1942.

Facilities
The line past Nyland is double track and electrified. The station features two wooden side platforms each with a shed. The station has a steep ramp to each platform. The station lacks a ticket machine.

Service
Vy serves Nyland with line L1 of the Oslo Commuter Rail. L1 calls at all stations, running from Lillestrøm Station along the Trunk Line past Alna to Oslo Central Station and then along the Drammen Line to Asker Station before serving the Spikkestad Line and terminating at Spikkestad Station. Alna has four trains per direction per hour. Travel time is 10 minutes to Oslo Central Station and 19 minutes to Lillestrøm.

References

Railway stations in Oslo
Railway stations on the Trunk Line
Railway stations opened in 1961
1961 establishments in Norway